Alain Colombe (born 13 September 1949) is a French retired slalom canoeist who competed in the 1960s and the 1970s. He won a gold medal in the K-1 team event at the 1969 ICF Canoe Slalom World Championships in Bourg St.-Maurice.

Colombe also finished 21st in the K-1 event at the 1972 Summer Olympics in Munich.

References

1949 births
Canoeists at the 1972 Summer Olympics
French male canoeists
Living people
Olympic canoeists of France
Medalists at the ICF Canoe Slalom World Championships